The 1934 Denver Pioneers football team was an American football team that represented the University of Denver as a member of the Rocky Mountain Conference (RMC) during the 1934 college football season. In their third season under head coach Percy Locey, the Pioneers compiled a 5–5–1 record (4–4 against conference opponents), finished in sixth place in the RMC, and outscored opponents by a total of 122 to 91.

Schedule

References

Denver
Denver Pioneers football seasons
Denver Pioneers football